Pastdargʻom District is a district of Samarqand Region in Uzbekistan. The capital lies at the city Juma.

The district consists of one city (Juma), 12 urban-type settlements (Charxin, Chortut, Oʻrta Charxin, Balhiyon, Goʻzalkent, Nayman, Jagʻalboyli, Mehnat, Hindiboyi, Agron, Iskandari, Saribosh) and 13 rural communities.

References 

Samarqand Region
Districts of Uzbekistan